Régional Flight 7775 was a flight from Pau Pyrénées Airport to Paris Charles de Gaulle Airport which crashed shortly after takeoff during wintry conditions. The flight was operated by Air France's regional subsidiary Régional using a Fokker 100. All passengers survived the incident but one person on the ground was killed. An investigation by the BEA determined that the cause of the accident was ice on the wings of the aircraft along with excessive rotation in the weather conditions during takeoff.

Aircraft
The aircraft involved in the incident was a Fokker 100 with the serial number 11362 and registration F-GMPG. It had its maiden flight in October 1991. The aircraft was initially delivered to TAT European Airlines and later operated by Air Liberté. It was subsequently leased to Air Corsica and then to Régional in  2005.

Investigation and cause

The Bureau of Enquiry and Analysis for Civil Aviation Safety conducted an investigation into the crash and announced that the cause was heavy ice on the wings. The investigation also determined that the captain raised the Fokker at a steeper angle of attack than necessary during the takeoff Rotation and underestimated the atmospheric conditions. The report concluded that although the chosen angle of attack would not have conventionally resulted in a stall, the ice on the wings had created extra drag and no aircraft de-icing had been carried out before take-off. Although both pilots had observed birds near the runway, no evidence of birdstrike was found.

See also
 Air Florida Flight 90
 Continental Airlines Flight 1713
 Turkish Airlines Flight 301

References

External Links

Aviation accidents and incidents in 2007
Accidents and incidents involving the Fokker 100
Airliner accidents and incidents caused by ice
Aviation accidents and incidents caused by loss of control
2007 disasters in France
January 2007 events in France